The Dirty Game is a 1965 anthology spy film starring Henry Fonda and Robert Ryan. Robert Ryan as American General Bruce is the link between three different spy stories, helmed by different directors; original James Bond director Terence Young and co-director Werner Klingler for the sequences in Berlin, Christian-Jaque for the French sequences, and Carlo Lizzani for the Italian sequences.

Plot
A man tells of three different spy missions he took part in.

Cast
 Henry Fonda as Dimitri Koulov
 Robert Ryan as General Bruce
 Vittorio Gassman as Perego / Ferrari (French)
 Annie Girardot as Suzette / Monique (French)
 Bourvil as Lalande
 Robert Hossein as Dupont
 Peter van Eyck as Petchatkin
 Maria Grazia Buccella as Natalia
 Mario Adorf as Callaghan
 Jacques Sernas as Sernas
 Georges Marchal as Serge
 Wolfgang Lukschy as Russian general
 Louis Arbessier as Ivanov
 Jackie Blanchot as Joe
 Gabriel Gobin as O'Hara
 Helmut Wildt as Perry
 Violette Marceau as Lisa
 Gabriella Giorgelli
 Nino Crisman
 Oreste Palella
 Renato Terra
 Klaus Kinski as Russian agent

See also
 List of American films of 1965
 Henry Fonda filmography
 Klaus Kinski filmography

References

External links

1965 films
1965 drama films
1960s spy drama films
American International Pictures films
American spy drama films
American anthology films
American black-and-white films
Cold War spy films
1960s English-language films
Films directed by Carlo Lizzani
Films directed by Christian-Jaque
Films directed by Terence Young
Films directed by Werner Klingler
Films set in Berlin
Films set in West Germany
Films set in Djibouti
Films set in Italy
French anthology films
French spy drama films
Italian spy drama films
West German films
German spy drama films
German anthology films
German black-and-white films
French black-and-white films
Italian black-and-white films
Italian anthology films
1960s thriller films
English-language French films
English-language German films
English-language Italian films
1960s American films
1960s Italian films
1960s French films
1960s German films